"Tomorrow Comes Today" is a song from British alternative rock virtual band Gorillaz's self-titled debut album Gorillaz and was their first release when issued as an EP in November 2000. The first three songs from the EP ended up on their debut album, however, "Latin Simone" was heavily edited, and dubbed into Spanish, for the album release. The new version was sung by Ibrahim Ferrer, and renamed "Latin Simone (¿Que Pasa Contigo?)". The original version is sung by 2-D (voiced by Damon Albarn) and appears along with "12D3" on some versions of the later-released compilation album G-Sides. The song itself was also the fourth and final single from that album, released on 25 February 2002. It peaked at number 33 on the UK Singles Chart. A demo version of the song, "I Got Law" was included as a bonus track of the Japanese edition of 13 by Blur, Damon Albarn's other musical project.

Formats and track listings
Enhanced CD EP (2000)
 "Tomorrow Comes Today" – 3:13
 "Rock the House" – 4:09
 "Latin Simone" – 3:38
 "12D3" – 3:24
 "Tomorrow Comes Today" (enhanced video) – 3:14

12-inch EP (2000)
 "Tomorrow Comes Today" – 3:14
 "Rock the House" – 4:09
 "Latin Simone" – 3:38
 "12D3" – 3:24

CD single (2002)
 "Tomorrow Comes Today" – 3:14
 "Film Music" – 3:04
 "Tomorrow Dub" (early version of "Bañana Baby") – 5:30
 "Tomorrow Comes Today" (music video) – 3:14

DVD single (2002)
 "Tomorrow Comes Today" (DVD music video) – 3:14
 "Film Music" – 3:04
 "Tomorrow Dub" (early version of "Bañana Baby") – 5:30
 "Jump the Gut Pt. 1" – 0:30
 "Jump the Gut Pt. 2" – 0:30

12-inch single (2002)
 "Tomorrow Comes Today" – 3:14
 "Film Music" (Mode Remix) – 6:15
 "Tomorrow Dub" (early version of "Bañana Baby") – 5:30

Personnel
Damon Albarn – vocals, keyboards, melodica, bass guitar
Miho Hatori – additional vocals
Dan the Automator – sampled loops
Jason Cox – engineering
Tom Girling – Pro Tools, engineering
Howie Weinberg – mastering

Music video
Directed by Jamie Hewlett, the video for the title track consists mainly of static drawings of the band members placed against real photographs and time-lapsed video footage of London streets. Some of the drawings are animated, especially the ones featuring 2-D singing. This is due to the video having an extremely short deadline compared to its follow-up "Clint Eastwood". The video finishes with the four band members, and 2-D's headache pills, flying across the screen during a fast-motion shot of a tunnel. Graffiti artwork by Banksy can be seen halfway through the video. Trellick Tower is also seen, known for being the birthplace of Gorillaz and where creators of the band Jamie Hewlett and Damon Albarn met.

Charts

Weekly charts

References

2000 debut EPs
EMI Records EPs
Gorillaz songs
2000 songs
2002 singles
EMI Records singles
Songs written by Damon Albarn
Songs written by Jamie Hewlett
Dub songs